Musipal is a studio album by Luke Vibert, released under the alias Wagon Christ. It was released in 2001 on Ninja Tune.

Critical reception
Tony Naylor of NME gave the album 3.5 stars out of 5, commenting that Musipal "amply illustrates Vibert's ability to make wild leaps of musical imagination." Spencer Owen of Pitchfork gave the album an 8.0 out of 10, saying, "There are plenty of flavors for anyone on Musipal, although the record as a whole may be too diverse for some, if that's possible."

Track listing

Charts

References

Further reading

External links
 

2001 albums
Luke Vibert albums
Ninja Tune albums